The North Carolina Education Lottery 200 is a NASCAR Camping World Truck Series race held in mid-May at Charlotte Motor Speedway in Concord, North Carolina. From the inaugural running in 2003 to 2019, the race was a companion event to the NASCAR All-Star Race in mid-May.

Past winners

2003, 2005, 2007–08, 2015 and 2022: Race extended due to a NASCAR overtime Finish.
2016: Race postponed from May 20 to May 21 because of inclement weather.
2020: Race postponed from May 15 to May 26 due to the COVID-19 pandemic.

Multiple winners (drivers)

Multiple winners (teams)

Manufacturer wins

References

External links
 

2003 establishments in North Carolina
 
NASCAR Truck Series races
Recurring sporting events established in 2003
Annual sporting events in the United States